Charles Arthur Bassett II (December 30, 1931 – February 28, 1966), (Major, USAF), was an American electrical engineer and United States Air Force test pilot. He went to Ohio State University for two years and later graduated from Texas Tech University with a Bachelor of Science degree in Electrical Engineering. He joined the Air Force as a pilot and graduated from both the Air Force's Experimental Test Pilot School and the Aerospace Research Pilot School. Bassett was married and had two children.

He was selected as a NASA astronaut in 1963 and was assigned to Gemini 9. He died in an airplane crash during training for his first spaceflight. He is memorialized on the Space Mirror Memorial; The Astronaut Monument; and the Fallen Astronaut memorial plaque, which was placed on the Moon during the Apollo 15 mission.

Early life and education 
Charles Arthur Bassett II was born on December 30, 1931, in Dayton, Ohio, to Charles "Pete" Bassett and Belle ( James) Bassett. Bassett was active in the Boy Scouts of America, where he achieved its second highest rank, Life Scout. During high school, Bassett was a model plane aficionado. He belonged to a club that built gasoline-powered models and flew them in the school gym. Bassett's interest in model airplanes translated to real aircraft; he made his first solo flight at age 16. He worked odd jobs at the airport to earn money for flying lessons and earned his private pilot license at age seventeen.

After graduating from Berea High School, in Berea, in 1950, he attended Ohio State University, in Columbus, from 1950 to 1952. Midway through college in 1952, Bassett enrolled in Air Force ROTC; he entered the U.S. Air Force as an aviation cadet in October of that year. He attended Texas Technological College, now Texas Tech University, from 1958 to 1960. He received a Bachelor of Science degree with honors in electrical engineering from Texas Tech and did graduate work at University of Southern California (USC) in Los Angeles.

Military service 

He started his career with training at Stallings Air Base, North Carolina, and Bryan Air Force Base, Texas. Bassett graduated from Bryan in December 1953 and was commissioned in the Air Force. He arrived for additional training in Nellis Air Force Base, Nevada, as a second lieutenant. There, he flew trainer aircraft, such as the T-6, the T-28, and the T-33, and flew the jet fighter F-86 Sabre in 1954.

He went to Korea with the 8th Fighter Bomber Group and flew a F-86 Sabre. Bassett was too late to fly any combat missions, and said, "If you don't have any challenge, you never know how good you are." Bassett was promoted to first lieutenant in May 1955. He returned from Korea in 1955 and was assigned to Suffolk County Air Force Base, in New York, flying aircraft such as the F-86D, the F-102, and the C-119.

In November 1960, Bassett went to Maxwell Air Force Base, in Alabama, to attend Squadron Officer School. He also graduated from the Air Force Experimental Test Pilot School (Class 62A) and the Aerospace Research Pilot School (Class III) and was promoted to captain. Bassett was an experimental test pilot and engineering test pilot in the Fighter Projects Office at Edwards Air Force Base, California, and logged over 3,600 hours of flying time, including over 2,900 hours in a jet aircraft.

NASA career 
Bassett was one of NASA's third group of astronauts, named in October 1963. In addition to participating in the overall astronaut training program, he had specific responsibilities related to training and simulators. On November 8, 1965, he was selected as pilot of the Gemini 9 mission with Elliot See as command pilot.

According to chief astronaut Deke Slayton's autobiography, he chose Bassett for Gemini 9 because he was "strong enough to carry" both himself and See. Slayton had also assigned Bassett as command module pilot for the second backup Apollo crew, alongside Frank Borman and William Anders.

Personal life 
On June 22, 1955, Bassett married Jeannie Martin. They had two children: Karen (December 22, 1957) and Peter (April 6, 1961).

Death 

Bassett and Elliot See died on February 28, 1966, when their T-38 trainer jet, piloted by See, crashed into McDonnell Aircraft Building 101, known as the McDonnell Space Center,  from Lambert Field airport in St. Louis, Missouri. Building 101 was where the Gemini spacecraft was built, and the two astronauts were going there that Monday morning to train for two weeks in a simulator. They died within  of their spacecraft. Bassett was decapitated, his head was found in the building's rafters.

Both men's remains were buried in Arlington National Cemetery on Friday, March 4. During funeral services in Texas two days earlier, astronauts Jim McDivitt and Jim Lovell and civilian pilot Jere Cobb flew the missing man formation in Bassett's honor, while Buzz Aldrin, Bill Anders, and Walter Cunningham did the same to honor See.

A NASA investigative panel later concluded that pilot error, caused by poor visibility due to bad weather, was the principal cause of the accident. The panel concluded that See was flying too low to the ground during his second approach, probably because of the poor visibility.

Memorials 

Bassett is honored at the Kennedy Space Center Visitor Center's Space Mirror Memorial, alongside 24 other NASA astronauts who died in the pursuit of space exploration.

His name also appears on the Fallen Astronaut memorial plaque at Hadley Rille on the Moon, placed by the Apollo 15 mission in 1971. Texas Tech University dedicated an Electrical Engineering Research Laboratory building in Bassett's honor in November 1996.

See also 
List of spaceflight-related accidents and incidents

References

Bibliography

External links 

Astronauts memorial foundation website  (a different archived version from 2011)
Astronautix biography of Charles Bassett

Arlington National Cemetery

1931 births
1966 deaths
Accidental deaths in Missouri
American electrical engineers
American test pilots
Aviators from Ohio
Aviators killed in aviation accidents or incidents in the United States
Burials at Arlington National Cemetery
Deaths by decapitation
Engineers from Ohio
Military personnel from Dayton, Ohio
Ohio State University alumni
Space program fatalities
Texas Tech University alumni
20th-century American engineers
United States Air Force astronauts
United States Air Force officers
U.S. Air Force Test Pilot School alumni
USC Viterbi School of Engineering alumni
Victims of aviation accidents or incidents in 1966